Semantic change (also semantic shift, semantic progression, semantic development, or semantic drift) is a form of language change regarding the evolution of word usage—usually to the point that the modern meaning is radically different from the original usage. In diachronic (or historical) linguistics, semantic change is a change in one of the meanings of a word. Every word has a variety of senses and connotations, which can be added, removed, or altered over time, often to the extent that cognates across space and time have very different meanings. The study of semantic change can be seen as part of etymology, onomasiology, semasiology, and semantics.

Examples in English
 Awful — Literally "full of awe", originally meant "inspiring wonder (or fear)", hence "impressive". In contemporary usage, the word means "extremely bad".
 Awesome — Literally "awe-inducing", originally meant "inspiring wonder (or fear)", hence "impressive". In contemporary usage, the word  means "extremely good".
 Terrible — Originally meant "inspiring terror", shifted to indicate anything spectacular, then to something spectacularly bad.
 Terrific — Originally meant "inspiring terror", shifted to indicate anything spectacular, then to something spectacularly good.
 Nice —  Originally meant "foolish, ignorant, frivolous, senseless." from Old French nice (12c.) meaning "careless, clumsy; weak; poor, needy; simple, stupid, silly, foolish," from Latin nescius ("ignorant or unaware"). Literally "not-knowing," from ne- "not" (from PIE root *ne- "not") + stem of scire "to know" (compare with science). "The sense development has been extraordinary, even for an adj." [Weekley] -- from "timid, faint-hearted" (pre-1300); to "fussy, fastidious" (late 14c.); to "dainty, delicate" (c. 1400); to "precise, careful" (1500s, preserved in such terms as a nice distinction and nice and early); to "agreeable, delightful" (1769); to "kind, thoughtful" (1830).
 Naïf or Naïve —Initially meant  "natural, primitive, or native" . From French naïf, literally "native". The masculine form of the French word, but used in English without reference to gender. As a noun, "natural, artless, naive person," first attested 1893, from French, where Old French naif also meant "native inhabitant; simpleton, natural fool."
 Demagogue — Originally meant "a popular leader". It is from the Greek dēmagōgós "leader of the people", from dēmos "people" + agōgós "leading, guiding". Now the word has strong connotations of a politician who panders to emotions and prejudice.
 Egregious — Originally described something that was remarkably good (as in Theorema Egregium). The word is from the Latin egregius "illustrious, select", literally, "standing out from the flock", which is from ex—"out of" + greg—(grex) "flock". Now it means something that is remarkably bad or flagrant.
 Gay — Originally meant (13th century) "lighthearted", "joyous" or (14th century) "bright and showy", it also came to mean "happy"; it acquired connotations of immorality as early as 1637, either sexual e.g., gay woman "prostitute", gay man "womaniser", gay house "brothel", or otherwise, e.g., gay dog "over-indulgent man" and gay deceiver "deceitful and lecherous". In the United States by 1897 the expression gay cat referred to a hobo, especially a younger hobo in the company of an older one; by 1935, it was used in prison slang for a homosexual boy; and by 1951, and clipped to gay, referred to homosexuals. George Chauncey, in his book Gay New York, would put this shift as early as the late 19th century among a certain "in crowd", knowledgeable of gay night-life. In the modern day, it is most often used to refer to homosexuals, at first among themselves and then in society at large, with a neutral connotation; or as a derogatory synonym for "silly", "dumb", or "boring". 
 Guy — Guy Fawkes was the alleged leader of a plot to blow up the English Houses of Parliament on 5 November 1605. The day was made a holiday, Guy Fawkes Day, commemorated by parading and burning a ragged manikin of Fawkes, known as a Guy. This led to the use of the word guy as a term for any "person of grotesque appearance" and then by the late 1800s—especially in the United States—for "any man", as in, e.g., "Some guy called for you." Over the 20th century, guy has replaced fellow in the U.S., and, under the influence of American popular culture, has been gradually replacing fellow, bloke, chap and other such words throughout the rest of the English-speaking world. In the plural, it can refer to a mixture of genders (e.g., "Come on, you guys!" could be directed to a group of mixed gender instead of only men).

Evolution of types 
A number of classification schemes have been suggested for semantic change.

A chronological list of typologies is presented below.

Typology by Reisig (1839) 
Reisig's ideas for a classification were published posthumously. He resorts to classical rhetorics and distinguishes between
 Synecdoche: shifts between part and whole
 Metonymy: shifts between cause and effect
 Metaphor

Typology by Paul (1880) 
 Generalization: enlargement of single senses of a word's meaning
 Specialization on a specific part of the contents: reduction of single senses of a word's meaning
 Transfer on a notion linked to the based notion in a spatial, temporal, or causal way

Typology by Darmesteter (1887) 
 Metaphor
 Metonymy
 Narrowing of meaning
 Widening of meaning
The last two are defined as change between whole and part, which would today be rendered as synecdoche.

Typology by Bréal (1899) 
 Restriction of sense: change from a general to a special meaning
 Enlargement of sense: change from a special to a general meaning
 Metaphor
 "Thickening" of sense: change from an abstract to a concrete meaning

Typology by Stern (1931) 
 Substitution: Change related to the change of an object, of the knowledge referring to the object, of the attitude toward the object, e.g., artillery "engines of war used to throw missiles" → "mounted guns", atom "inseparable smallest physical-chemical element" → "physical-chemical element consisting of electrons", scholasticism "philosophical system of the Middle Ages" → "servile adherence to the methods and teaching of schools"
 Analogy: Change triggered by the change of an associated word, e.g., fast adj. "fixed and rapid" ← faste adv. "fixedly, rapidly")
 Shortening: e.g., periodical ← periodical paper
 Nomination: "the intentional naming of a referent, new or old, with a name that has not previously been used for it" (Stern 1931: 282), e.g., lion "brave man" ← "lion"
 Regular transfer: a subconscious Nomination
 Permutation: non-intentional shift of one referent to another due to a reinterpretation of a situation, e.g., bead "prayer" → "pearl in a rosary")
 Adequation: Change in the attitude of a concept; distinction from substitution is unclear.
This classification does not neatly distinguish between processes and forces/causes of semantic change.

Typology by Bloomfield (1933) 

The most widely accepted scheme in the English-speaking academic world is from :
 Narrowing: Change from superordinate level to subordinate level. For example, skyline formerly referred to any horizon, but now in the US it has narrowed to a horizon decorated by skyscrapers.
 Widening: There are many examples of specific brand names being used for the general product, such as with Kleenex. Such uses are known as generonyms: see genericization.
 Metaphor: Change based on similarity of thing. For example, broadcast originally meant "to cast seeds out"; with the advent of radio and television, the word was extended to indicate the transmission of audio and video signals. Outside of agricultural circles, very few use broadcast in the earlier sense.
 Metonymy: Change based on nearness in space or time, e.g., jaw "cheek" → "mandible".
 Synecdoche: Change based on whole-part relation. The convention of using capital cities to represent countries or their governments is an example of this.
 Hyperbole: Change from weaker to stronger meaning, e.g., kill "torment" → "slaughter"
 Meiosis: Change from stronger to weaker meaning, e.g., astound "strike with thunder" → "surprise strongly".
 Degeneration: e.g., knave "boy" → "servant" → "deceitful or despicable man"; awful "awe-inspiring" → "very bad."
 Elevation: e.g., knight "boy" → "nobleman"; terrific "terrifying" → "astonishing" → "very good".

Typology by Ullmann (1957, 1962) 
Ullmann distinguishes between nature and consequences of semantic change:
 Nature of semantic change
 Metaphor: change based on a similarity of senses
 Metonymy: change based on a contiguity of senses
 Folk-etymology: change based on a similarity of names
 Ellipsis: change based on a contiguity of names
 Consequences of semantic change
 Widening of meaning: rise of quantity
 Narrowing of meaning: loss of quantity
 Amelioration of meaning: rise of quality
 Pejoration of meaning: loss of quality

Typology by Blank (1999) 

However, the categorization of  has gained increasing acceptance:
 Metaphor: Change based on similarity between concepts, e.g., mouse "rodent" → "computer device".
 Metonymy: Change based on contiguity between concepts, e.g., horn "animal horn" → "musical instrument".
 Synecdoche: A type of metonymy involving a part to whole relationship, e.g. "hands" from "all hands on deck" → "bodies"
 Specialization of meaning: Downward shift in a taxonomy, e.g., corn "grain" → "wheat" (UK), → "maize" (US).
 Generalization of meaning: Upward shift in a taxonomy, e.g., hoover "Hoover vacuum cleaner" → "any type of vacuum cleaner".
 Cohyponymic transfer: Horizontal shift in a taxonomy, e.g., the confusion of mouse and rat in some dialects.
 Antiphrasis: Change based on a contrastive aspect of the concepts, e.g., perfect lady in the sense of "prostitute".
 Auto-antonymy: Change of a word's sense and concept to the complementary opposite, e.g., bad in the slang sense of "good".
 Auto-converse: Lexical expression of a relationship by the two extremes of the respective relationship, e.g., take in the dialectal use as "give".
 Ellipsis: Semantic change based on the contiguity of names, e.g., car "cart" → "automobile", due to the invention of the (motor) car.
 Folk-etymology: Semantic change based on the similarity of names, e.g., French contredanse, orig. English country dance.

Blank considered it problematic to include amelioration and pejoration of meaning (as in Ullman) as well as strengthening and weakening of meaning (as in Bloomfield). According to Blank, these are not objectively classifiable phenomena; moreover, Blank has argued that all of the examples listed under these headings can be grouped under other phenomena, rendering the categories redundant.

Forces triggering change 
Blank has tried to create a complete list of motivations for semantic change. They can be summarized as:
 Linguistic forces
 Psychological forces
 Sociocultural forces
 Cultural/encyclopedic forces

This list has been revised and slightly enlarged by :
 Fuzziness (i.e., difficulties in classifying the referent or attributing the right word to the referent, thus mixing up designations)
 Dominance of the prototype (i.e., fuzzy difference between superordinate and subordinate term due to the monopoly of the prototypical member of a category in the real world)
 Social reasons (i.e., contact situation with "undemarcation" effects)
 Institutional and non-institutional linguistic pre- and proscriptivism (i.e., legal and peer-group linguistic pre- and proscriptivism, aiming at "demarcation")
 Flattery
 Insult
 Disguising language (i.e., "misnomers")
 Taboo (i.e., taboo concepts)
 Aesthetic-formal reasons (i.e., avoidance of words that are phonetically similar or identical to negatively associated words)
 Communicative-formal reasons (i.e., abolition of the ambiguity of forms in context, keyword: "homonymic conflict and polysemic conflict")
 Wordplay/punning
 Excessive length of words
 Morphological misinterpretation (keyword: "folk-etymology", creation of transparency by changes within a word)
 Logical-formal reasons (keyword: "lexical regularization", creation of consociation)
 Desire for plasticity (creation of a salient motivation of a name)
 Anthropological salience of a concept (i.e., anthropologically given emotionality of a concept, "natural salience")
 Culture-induced salience of a concept ("cultural importance")
 Changes in the referents (i.e., changes in the world)
 Worldview change (i.e., changes in the categorization of the world)
 Prestige/fashion (based on the prestige of another language or variety, of certain word-formation patterns, or of certain semasiological centers of expansion)

The case of reappropriation
A specific case of semantic change is reappropriation, a cultural process by which a group reclaims words or artifacts that were previously used in a way disparaging of that group, for example like with the word queer. Other related processes include pejoration and amelioration.

Practical studies 
Apart from many individual studies, etymological dictionaries are prominent reference books for finding out about semantic changes. A recent survey lists practical tools and online systems for investigating semantic change of words over time. WordEvolutionStudy is an academic platform that takes arbitrary words as input to generate summary views of their evolution based on Google Books ngram dataset and the Corpus of Historical American English.

See also 

 Calque
 Dead metaphor
 Euphemism treadmill
 False friend
 Genericized trademark
 Language change
 Lexicology and lexical semantics
 List of calques
 Newspeak
 Phono-semantic matching
 Q-based narrowing
 Semantic field
 Skunked term
 Retronym

Notes

References 
 
 
 
 
 
 
 
 
 
 
 
 
 
 
 
 
 
 
 
 
 Vanhove, Martine (2008), From Polysemy to Semantic change: Towards a Typology of Lexical Semantic Associations, Studies in Language Companion Series 106, Amsterdam, New York: Benjamins.
 
 Zuckermann, Ghil'ad (2003), Language Contact and Lexical Enrichment in Israeli Hebrew. Palgrave Macmillan, .

Further reading 
 AlBader, Yousuf B. (2015) "Semantic Innovation and Change in Kuwaiti Arabic: A Study of the Polysemy of Verbs"
 AlBader, Yousuf B. (2016) "From dašš l-ġōṣ to dašš twitar: Semantic Change in Kuwaiti Arabic"
 AlBader, Yousuf B. (2017) "Polysemy and Semantic Change in the Arabic Language and Dialects"
 Grzega, Joachim (2000), "Historical Semantics in the Light of Cognitive Linguistics: Aspects of a new reference book reviewed", Arbeiten aus Anglistik und Amerikanistik 25: 233–244.
 Koch, Peter (2002), "Lexical typology from a cognitive and linguistic point of view", in: Cruse, D. Alan et al. (eds.), Lexicology: An international handbook on the nature and structure of words and vocabularies/lexikologie: Ein internationales Handbuch zur Natur und Struktur von Wörtern und Wortschätzen, [Handbücher zur Sprach- und Kommunikationswissenschaft 21], Berlin/New York: Walter de Gruyter, vol. 1, 1142–1178.
 Wundt, Wilhelm (1912), Völkerpsychologie: Eine Untersuchung der Entwicklungsgesetze von Sprache, Mythus und Sitte, vol. 2,2: Die Sprache, Leipzig: Engelmann.

External links 
 Onomasiology Online (internet platform by Joachim Grzega, Alfred Bammesberger and Marion Schöner, including a list of etymological dictionaries)
 Etymonline, Online Etymology Dictionary of the English language.
 Exploring Word Evolution An online analysis tool for studying evolution of any input words based on Google Books n-gram dataset and the Corpus of Historical American English (COHA).

Historical linguistics
Lexicology
Semantics
Semantic relations